Provincial Trunk Highway 13 (PTH 13) is a provincial highway in the Canadian province of Manitoba. It is an RTAC route capable of handling RTAC vehicles such as trucks, truck and pony trailers, trucks and full trailers, truck tractors and semi-trailers, A-trains, B-trains, or C-trains. The route extends south to north from its junction with PTH 3 and PR 245 in Carman to its junction with PTH 1 and PR 430 north of Oakville.  The northern terminus of PTH 13 is located between Portage la Prairie and Manitoba's capital city Winnipeg. The Central Manitoba Railway (CEMR) shortline rail intersects PTH 13 north of Carman, the Canadian Pacific Railway (CPR) intersects at Elm Creek, and the Canadian National Railway (CNR) at Oakville.

Route description 

Pembina Valley located in southern Manitoba demarks the southern terminus of PTH 13, featuring agricultural plains, and rolling hills. PTH 13 begins at the junction with PTH 3 and PR 245 at Carman. Carman's slogan, 'A Community of All Seasons. . . for Lots of Reasons!' gives support to its growing economic horticulture base Vanderveen Greenhouses, Canada's biggest greenhouse operation and Aubin's Nurseries. Carman's municipal campground is located in King's Park near the Carman Aquatic Centre. Carman is located on the banks of the Boyne River. The Stephenfield Lake Watershed Management Plan and Stephenfield Provincial Park are located to the west of PTH 13. Grain and livestock farming are the main agricultural pursuits of residents of Grey Rural Municipality.

History 
The original PTH 13 went from the PTH 14 Junction in Emerson southeast to the Minnesota border. This was eliminated in 1942.
PTH 13 first appeared on the 1947-48 Manitoba Highway Map. Originally, it served as a short connector route spanning  between its current southern terminus with PTH 3 in Carman and PTH 2 near Elm Creek.

PTH 13 was extended further north and east in 1957 to meet PTH 1 near St. Francois Xavier. The following year, the highway was shortened to its current northern terminus north of Oakville when PTH 1 was reconfigured to its current route.

On September 12, 2007 the Manitoba government entered to cost share safety improvements at a railway crossing at Highway 13 near Oakville to provide an automated advance warning system..

Major intersections

See also 
List of Manitoba provincial highways

References

External links 

Manitoba government Official Highway Map
AMM - Association of Manitoba Municipalities

013